See also 1700 in piracy, other events in 1701, 1702 in piracy, and Timeline of piracy.

Events

Europe
May 23 - William Kidd is hanged for piracy and murder at Execution Dock in London.

Indian Ocean
John Bowen's crew builds a pirate base at Maritan in Madagascar.

Deaths
May 23 - William Kidd, privateer and pirate (born c. 1645).

Piracy
Piracy by year
1701 in military history